The 1996 Recopa Sudamericana was the eighth Recopa Sudamericana, an annual football match between the winners of the previous season's Copa Libertadores and Supercopa Sudamericana competitions.

The match was contested between Grêmio, winners of the 1995 Copa Libertadores, and defending champions Independiente, winners of the 1995 Supercopa Sudamericana, on April 7, 1996. Grêmio easily dethroned Independiente after a 4-1 thumping in order to consecrate themselves champions of the competition for the first time.

Qualified teams

Match details

References

Rec
Recopa Sudamericana
Recopa Sudamericana, 1996
Recopa Sudamericana 1996
Recopa Sudamericana 1996
1996